Embassy is a 1969 spy thriller novel by a British writer named Stephen Coulter. A top Soviet official defects to the West and takes shelter in the American Embassy in Paris.

In 1972 the novel was adapted into a film of the same title directed by Gordon Hessler starring Richard Roundtree and Ray Milland.

References

Bibliography
 Reilly, John M. Twentieth Century Crime & Mystery Writers. Springer, 2015.

1969 British novels
Novels by Stephen Coulter
British spy novels
British thriller novels
British novels adapted into films
Heinemann (publisher) books